NpP2S4 is a compound related to Lawesson's reagent formed by the reaction of 1-bromonaphthalene with P4S10, this is a 1,3,2,4-dithiadiphosphetane 2,4-disulfide which has a naphth-1,8-diyl group holding the two phosphorus atoms together. The mechanism by which the NpP2S4 forms is not yet elucidated, but it is thought to occur by a process involving free radicals, and naphthalene has been detected as a side product in its synthesis. In general, NpP2S4 has been found to be less reactive than Lawesson's reagent, in agreement with the hypothesis that the dithiophosphine ylides are responsible for the majority of the chemical reactions of the 1,3,2,4-dithiadiphosphetane 2,4-disulfides.

NpP2S4 has been found to react with many hydroxyl compounds, such as methanol, ethylene glycol and a catechol to form species with oxygen atoms bonded to the phosphorus atoms.

NpP2S4 when refluxed in methanol reacts to form a heterocycle C12H12OP2S with one O-methyl and one S-methyl bonded to the two phosphorus atoms.

References

Reagents for organic chemistry
Organosulfur compounds
Naphthalenes